Overmeer is a neighbourhood of Nederhorst den Berg and former village in the Dutch province of North Holland. It is a part of the municipality of Wijdemeren, and lies about 8 km northwest of Hilversum. Overmeer used to be a separate village, but has now grown together with the town of Nederhorst den Berg.

References

Populated places in North Holland
Wijdemeren